Lifehouse may refer to:

Churches 
 Lifehouse International Church, a network of churches in Asia 
 Lifehouse, a CRC International church in Murray Bridge, South Australia

Music
 Lifehouse (band), an American rock band
 Lifehouse (album) (2005), the band's self-titled album
 Lifehouse (rock opera), a rock opera by the British rock band The Who

Other uses
 Lifehouse (novel) (1982), a science-fiction novel by Spider Robinson

See also